Eugnosta pamirana is a species of moth of the family Tortricidae. It is found in Tajikistan and Afghanistan.

References

Moths described in 1943
Eugnosta